Mark Helfrich (born 8 September 1978) is a German politician of the Christian Democratic Union (CDU) who has been serving as a member of the Bundestag from the state of Schleswig-Holstein since 2013.

Political career 
Helfrich became a member of the Bundestag in the 2013 German federal election. From 2013 until 2014, he served on the Committee on Labor and Social Affairs as well as the Parliamentary Advisory Board on Sustainable Development. Since 2018, he has been a member of the Committee on European Union Affairs and the Committee on Economic and Energy Affairs.

Since the 2021 elections, Helfrich has been serving as his parliamentary group’s spokesperson for energy policy.

Other activities 
 Agora Energiewende, Member of the Council 
 German Industry Initiative for Energy Efficiency (DENEFF), Member of the Parliamentary Advisory Board
 Rotary International, Member

Political positions 
In June 2017, Helfrich voted against his parliamentary group’s majority and in favor of Germany's introduction of same-sex marriage.

References

External links 

  
 Bundestag biography 

1978 births
Living people
Members of the Bundestag for Schleswig-Holstein
Members of the Bundestag 2021–2025
Members of the Bundestag 2017–2021
Members of the Bundestag 2013–2017
Members of the Bundestag for the Christian Democratic Union of Germany